Citricoccus is a Gram-positive and non-motile genus of bacteria from the family Micrococcaceae.

References

Micrococcaceae
Bacteria genera